David Albert Huffman (August 9, 1925 – October 7, 1999) was an American pioneer in computer science, known for his Huffman coding. He was also one of the pioneers in the field of mathematical origami.

Education
Huffman earned his bachelor's degree in electrical engineering from Ohio State University in 1944. Then, he served two years as an officer in the United States Navy. He returned to Ohio State to earn his master's degree in electrical engineering in 1949. In 1953, he earned his Doctor of Science in electrical engineering at the Massachusetts Institute of Technology (MIT), with the thesis The Synthesis of Sequential Switching Circuits, advised by Samuel H. Caldwell.

Career
Huffman joined the faculty at MIT in 1953. In 1967, he joined the faculty of University of California, Santa Cruz and helped found its Computer Science Department, where he served as chair from 1970 to 1973. He retired in 1994.

Huffman is best known for Huffman coding, which he published while a ScD student at MIT in 1952.  However, he reportedly was more proud of his work "The Synthesis of Sequential Switching Circuits," which was the topic of his 1953 MIT thesis (an abridged version of which was published by in the Journal of the Franklin Institute in 1954.)

Awards and honors
 1955: The Louis E. Levy Medal from the Franklin Institute for his doctoral thesis on sequential switching circuits.
 1973: The W. Wallace McDowell Award from the IEEE Computer Society.
 1981: Charter recipient of the Computer Pioneer Award from the IEEE Computer Society.
 1998: A Golden Jubilee Award for Technological Innovation from the IEEE Information Theory Society, for "the invention of the Huffman minimum-length lossless data-compression code".
 1999: The IEEE Richard W. Hamming Medal.

References

External links
 
 
 

1925 births
1999 deaths
American information theorists
Ohio State University College of Engineering alumni
University of California, Santa Cruz faculty
20th-century American mathematicians